Lee Toy Kim better known as Granny Lum Loy or Lu Moo (26 February 1884 – 20 August 1980) was a renowned Chinese businesswoman in Darwin in the Northern Territory of Australia.

Early life

Loy was born in Shekki in China in 1884. She moved to Darwin in 1898, one of two adopted children of Fong Sui Wing. Loy married a mining engineer Lum Loy, and together they moved to Pine Creek. They had one daughter named Lizzie Yook.

Life in Darwin

After the death of her husband in 1918, Lee Toy Kim moved back to Darwin. She established a mango plantation in Fannie Bay. After selling the plantation in 1935, Loy and her daughter ran a cafe in central Darwin. She purchased a block in Stuart Park where she started a chicken farm.

Loy was evacuated to Sydney after the bombing of Darwin by the Japanese in 1942. She returned to Darwin, working a market garden on the Stuart Highway outside Darwin.

She is remembered as an elderly lady in traditional Chinese trousers, jacket and hat, who walked each day from Stuart Park to the centre of Darwin and sold produce as the Rapid Creek Markets. She was an active member of the Chinese community and a regular worshiper at the Joss House Chinese temple. A portrait of Loy painted by artist Geoff la Gersche was entered in the Archibald Prize in 1979.

Loy died on 20 August 1980 at the age of 96. Her funeral in 1980 was reportedly one of the biggest and longest in Darwin's history. She is buried in the Gardens Road Cemetery.

References

1884 births
1980 deaths
People from Darwin, Northern Territory
Women in agriculture
Emigrants from the Qing Empire to Australia